Sir John Wriothesley Russell  (22 August 1914 – 3 August 1984) was a British diplomat and ambassador.

He was the only son of Thomas Wentworth Russell, better known as Russell Pasha, who was descended from John Russell, 6th Duke of Bedford.

He was educated at Eton College and graduated from Trinity College, Cambridge, in 1935 with a Bachelor of Arts (B.A.). He was part of the British Embassy in Moscow in 1941 and in 1956, also with a M.A. degree, after which he was awarded a CMG in the 1958 Birthday Honours. He was British Ambassador to Ethiopia, 1962–1966, was awarded a KCVO in 1965, being British Ambassador to Brazil, 1966–1969, GCVO in 1968, and British Ambassador to Spain, 1969 – 1974.

He was married to Aliki Diplarakou, the first Greek Miss Europe, and had a son, Alexander, and a daughter, Georgiana.

He was interviewed briefly in the famous documentary series The World At War in 1973.

Ancestry

References

 Charles Mosley, editor, "Burke's Peerage, Baronetage & Knightage", 107th edition, 3 volumes (Wilmington, Delaware, U.S.A.: Burke's Peerage (Genealogical Books) Ltd, 2003), volume 1, page 321.

1914 births
1984 deaths
Ambassadors of the United Kingdom to Spain
Ambassadors of the United Kingdom to Ethiopia
Ambassadors of the United Kingdom to Brazil
People educated at Eton College
Alumni of Trinity College, Cambridge